The 2005 UCI Mountain Bike World Cup included four disciplines: marathon, cross-country, downhill and 4-cross.

Cross-country

Downhill

Marathon

Four-cross

See also
2005 UCI Mountain Bike & Trials World Championships

2005
2005 in mountain biking